Ivan Manuel Gomes Forbes (born 1 December 1986 in Portimão), is a Portuguese footballer who plays for Ostuni Sport, as a winger.

References

External links

1986 births
Living people
People from Portimão
Portuguese footballers
London Tigers F.C. players
Dorchester Town F.C. players
Havant & Waterlooville F.C. players
Akritas Chlorakas players
AEK Kouklia F.C. players
Pafos FC players
S.S. Monopoli 1966 players
National League (English football) players
Cypriot First Division players
Cypriot Second Division players
Portuguese expatriate footballers
Expatriate footballers in England
Expatriate footballers in Cyprus
Portuguese expatriate sportspeople in Cyprus
Association football wingers
Sportspeople from Faro District